Williamsport is an unincorporated community on Patterson Creek in Grant County, West Virginia, USA. Williamsport is the birthplace of J.R. Clifford (1848-1933), West Virginia's first African-American attorney.

Joseph V. Williams, an early postmaster, gave the community his name.

Notable residents 
 J. R. Clifford, who became West Virginia's first African-American attorney

References

Unincorporated communities in Grant County, West Virginia
Unincorporated communities in West Virginia